Felt, Not Heard (shortened to FNH) is an American studio company specializing in sound design, musical composition, and audio production. It was founded by composer Joe Johnson in 2008, and is currently headquartered in New York City.

Since their formation in 2008, they have co-operated with creative companies for various commercials, films and motion graphics. Some of their clients include TBWA Worldwide, Squarespace, Adidas, A24, Comedy Central, and Mitsubishi. In 2011, Mr. Johnson was awarded with the Art Director's Club Young Gun award which "recognizes the vanguard of creative professionals 30 years of age and under."

Clients 
These are the clients Felt, Not Heard has collaborated with:

 TBWA Worldwide
 AIGA
 Axe
 Buxom
 Clinique
 Mercedes-Benz
 Vanderbilt University Hospital
 Squarespace
 Adidas
 Arper
 NYCxDesign
 TED
 I Am Always Hungry
 Michael Kors
 Nissan
 A24
 AwesomenessTV
 Comedy Central
 bareMinerals
 Prada
 2x4
 Gilette

Logo and name meaning 
The logo for Felt, Not Heard was designed by creative agency, DIA. According to them,The graphic system is based on four lines which references a bass instrument's four strings. We chose an extremely reductive design to visually represent subtly of Felt, Not Heard.Alluding to the explanation, the name of the company is a general music term about the use of the bass guitar quietly in an ensemble.

References 

Recording studios in Manhattan
American companies established in 2008